Luca Lionello (born 9 January 1964) is an Italian actor.

Biography
Born in Rome to actor and voice dubbing artist Oreste Lionello, he has been actor since 1986. Since then, Lionello came to international attention in 2004, when he played the role of Judas Iscariot in Mel Gibson's The Passion of the Christ.

He was an atheist until 2004, when he became a Catholic, owing to his experience filming The Passion of the Christ.

He has also played at least two other Apostles: St. Barnabas in Imperium: St. Peter, starring Omar Sharif, and St. Thomas in Abel Ferrara's Mary.

References

External links 

1964 births
Converts to Roman Catholicism from atheism or agnosticism
Italian male film actors
Italian Roman Catholics
Living people
Male actors from Rome
Accademia Nazionale di Arte Drammatica Silvio D'Amico alumni